Snag Lake is a lake located in the north eastern part of Lassen Volcanic National Park in California, United States.

Description
Water from the nearby Horseshoe Lake empties into Snag Lake via Grassy Creek. Water from Snag Lake continues to flow through the porous lava field that led to the lake's creation eventually making its way into Butte Lake.

Access
Snag Lake is accessible by hiking trail only.

See also
List of lakes in California

References

Lakes of Lassen Volcanic National Park
Lakes of Lassen County, California
Lakes of California
Lakes of Northern California